Vesti ("News") is a brand used by the Russian broadcaster VGTRK and the regional GTRKs for their news service on television, on radio and online.

News bulletins on Russia-1 had been using three horses motif in opening titles. It was dropped for once, and once again in 2014 brand refresh.

History 
The very first edition of Vesti went on air on 13 May 1991 at 17:00. With that, the RTV channel began its broadcast, now known as Russia-1. From May 14, Vesti began broadcasting 15 minutes-long editions at 20:00 and 23:00. Compared to Vremya, Vesti was innovative in terms of news presentation. For the first months of broadcast it was an opposition media, supportive of Boris Yeltsin and the democrats. After the August coup and breakup of the USSR, Vesti turned into official news bulletin of the new, post-Soviet Russia. The program was later extended to 50 minutes in 2002 due to the now called Telekanal Rossiya now airing a children’s program Spokoynoy nochi, malyshi at 20.50 (due to the fact that Channel One no longer airs it), and Vesti’s logo is inspired by the BBC. Vesti now airs at a full hour at 20.00.

Editions
 11:00
 14:00
 17:00 (Monday - Friday)
 20:00 (Monday - Friday)
 Vesti v Subbotu ("Saturday News", 20:00)
 Vesti Nedeli ("News of the Week", 20:00 Sunday)

Hosts

Current

Former

References

External links
 

Mass media companies of Russia
Russian television shows
Russian television news shows
1990s Russian television series
2000s Russian television series
2010s Russian television series
2020s Russian television series
Flagship evening news shows